Jehnny Beth (born Camille Berthomier, 24 December 1984), is a French musician, singer-songwriter, producer, presenter and actress, best known as half of the duo John & Jehn and front woman of the English rock band Savages. Her debut solo album To Love Is to Live was released to critical acclaim in June 2020. She also collaborated with other artists such as Trentemøller, Julian Casablancas, Tindersticks, Gorillaz, Noel Gallagher, Romy Madley Croft of the xx, Idles and Bobby Gillespie of Primal Scream. In 2021, she released a duet album with Gillespie  titled Utopian Ashes which received favourable reviews.

In addition to her music career, Beth played in several films including An Impossible Love in 2018, for which she received a nomination for the Best Female Newcomer at the 2019 Cesar Awards.

Early life 
Jehnny Beth was born in Poitiers, Vienne, France to Catholic theater-director parents. Describing them, she said they, "[...]were keen to impress the importance of academic study on her and her sister[...]". She had her first music instructors, a pair of jazz musicians, to learn piano and sing at the age of around 8, Chet Baker's songs in English. Her theatrical and musical career started in an early age by playing the title role in Henrik Ibsen’s Peer Gynt and performing her first piano recital at 10. She was trained in dramatic arts at the conservatoire de Poitiers. 
  
In late 2006, she moved to London with fellow John & Jehn member, Nicolas Congé (aka Johnny Hostile) to pursue their career as a duo.

Music career

John and Jehn

Beth  met fellow musician Nicolas Congé and formed John & Jehn in France in 2006. They released two albums including their self-titled debut album which received favourable reviews. The band also includes Savages' founding member Gemma Thompson on keyboards and guitar.

Savages

Originally formed in 2011 by Thompson and bassist Ayse Hassan, Beth  becoming the vocalist of the band after Hostile turned down Thompson's request to front the band. The band gained commercial success when their debut album, Silence Yourself, which peaked at number 19 on the UK albums chart. Adore Life was released in 2016. Both albums were nominated for the Mercury Prize, in 2013 and 2016 respectively.

Solo
In 2015, Beth  took part of the "David Bowie Is ..." exhibition by performing live some of Bowie's hits, including "Space Oddity" and "The Man Who Sold the World". On 27 June 2016, Beth  performed live solo to open for PJ Harvey at the Eden Project in Cornwall, England. On 11 February 2017, Beth played her first full solo (piano) performance at Grauzone Festival in The Hague, The Netherlands 

In June 2020, Beth  released To Love Is to Live, her first solo album – or "personal" album as she refers to it. It featured collaborations with singer Joe Talbot of Idles, arranger and producer Atticus Ross (a frequent collaborator of Trent Reznor), and singer Romy Croft of the xx. Croft recorded backing vocals on the song "We Will Sin Together" which was promoted as a single. The album was widely acclaimed by critics. Videos were shot to promote the singles "I'm the Man", "Flower", "Heroine", and "We Will Sin Together". Beth's YouTube channel also includes a concert performed at the BBC Radio 6 Music Festival in London, at the Roundhouse prior to the release of the album.

Collaborations
In 2015, Danish electronic music producer and multi-instrumentalist Trentemøller released the album Fixion, including "River in Me" and "Complicated" with Beth on vocals. Trentemøller has described Beth's voice as "intense and unique". In 2015, Beth and the Strokes front man Julian Casablancas recorded a duet and released the single "Boy/Girl" (which was a cover version of Sort Sol and Lydia Lunch). In 2016, she duetted with Primal Scream for a live performance of "Some Velvet Morning" at the Bristol's Downs festival. That year, she recorded vocals for "We Are Dreamers" on Tindersticks's album The Waiting Room. On 13 March, Beth  joined the xx onstage to perform "Infinity" together at O2 Academy Brixton, London. On 23 March, Beth was announced to be the featured artist for "We Got the Power", Gorillaz's second single from album Humanz. The song also included former Oasis member Noel Gallagher in backing vocals. On 5 May 2017, they performed the song live on The Graham Norton Show.

Beth and Hostile wrote the score for the documentary film XY Chelsea in 2019. The 23 songs were released under the banner of "XY Chelsea -original soundtrack composed and performed by Johnny Hostile and Jehnny Beth", on double LP vinyl on the website of their label Pop Noire. "Let it Out" was the single featuring Beth on vocals released ahead of the album. In 2020, Beth recorded vocals on the song "Ne Touche pas Moi" for Idles on their album Ultra Mono.

In 2021, she released Utopian Ashes, a duet album with Bobby Gillepsie; it was issued under the banner of both artists "Bobby Gillepsie and Jehnny Beth". Utopian Ashes was met with generally positive reviews from music critics. At Metacritic, which assigns a normalized rating out of 100 to reviews from professional publications, the album received an average score of 80, based on 14 reviews, indicating "generally favorable reviews". Two videos featuring Beth and Gillespie were shot to accompany the singles "Chase it Down" and "Remember We Were Lovers" and uploaded on YouTube.

Acting
Beth played the lead role in the 2005 French mystery film Through the Forest directed by Jean-Paul Civeyrac. She also played a role as Marie-Jeanne in a 2009 horror French film Sodium Babies. In 2018 she played a role in the film An Impossible Love by director Catherine Corsini: Beth then received a nomination for the "Best Female Newcomer" at the 2019 Cesar Awards which is the national film award of France.

Writing
She published a book titled C.A.L.M: 12 erotic short stories with Johnny Hostile in June 2020. The book included film noir stories written by Beth with photographies taken by Hostile.  It was presented as a "manifesto in the form of erotic photography, monologues and dialogues, Johnny Hostile's stimulating photography punctuates Jehnny Beth's seductive prose". The full collection of Hostile's photography is featured in a limited-edition hard cover art book title C.A.L.M: Crimes Against Love Memories. A fanzine with a different content, also titled Calm, was also issued.

Radio host and TV host
She ran her own Beats 1 radio programme, Start Making Sense, which premiered on 12 April 2016. In 2020, Beth also started to present a 60 minute TV show on European channel Arte, titled Echoes with Jehnny Beth, featuring discussions with musicians and live performances of bands: all the episodes of Echoes with Jehnny Beth are available on YouTube worldwide.

Producing
In 2011, she founded the record label "Pop Noire" with Johnny Hostile and artist director Antoine Carlier. Their label, based in Paris, features several French and International acts on their roster.

Personal life
Beth  has been in a relationship with Johnny Hostile since 2006. She is bisexual, stating that "I’ve been a bisexual since a very young age."

Discography

John & Jehn
 John & Jehn (2008)
 Time for the Devil (2010)

Savages
 Silence Yourself (2013)
 Adore Life (2016)

Solo
 To Love Is to Live (2020)

Bobby Gillespie and Jehnny Beth
 Utopian Ashes (2021)

Filmography

References

External links
 www.jehnnybeth.com
 Facebook official
 Instagram official
 Twitter official

1984 births
French rock musicians
Bisexual musicians
Living people
French expatriates in the United Kingdom
French rock singers
Post-punk musicians
French women singer-songwriters
French singer-songwriters
Bisexual women
21st-century French actresses
21st-century French women musicians
Noise rock musicians
People from Poitiers
21st-century French singers
21st-century French women singers
French women guitarists
Matador Records artists
French rock guitarists
Bisexual actresses
French LGBT singers
20th-century French LGBT people
21st-century French LGBT people
Cult Records artists
Women punk rock singers